The Witch trials in England were conducted from the 15th century until the 18th century. They are estimated to have resulted in the death of perhaps 500 people, 90 percent of whom were women. The witch hunt was as its most intense stage during the English Civil War (1642–1651) and the Puritan era of the mid-17th century.

History

Chronology

Witch trials are known to have occurred in England during the Middle Ages. These cases were few, and mainly concerned cases toward people of the elite or with ties to the elite, often with a political purpose. Examples of these were the trials against Eleanor Cobham and Margery Jourdemayne in 1441, which resulted in lifetime imprisonment for the former, and an execution for heresy for the latter.

It was, however, not until the second half of the 16th century that a widescale witch hunt took place in England. The cases became more common in the end of the 16th century and the early 17th century, particularly since the succession of James VI and I to the throne.  King James had shown a great interest in witch trials since the Copenhagen witch trials in 1589, which had inspired the North Berwick witch trials in Scotland in 1590. When he succeeded to the English throne in 1603, he sharpened the English Witchcraft Act the following year.

Witch trials were most frequent in England in the first half of the 17th century. They reached their most intense phase during the English civil war of the 1640s and the Puritan era of the 1650s. This was a period of intense witch hunts, known for witch hunters such as Matthew Hopkins.

Legal situation

The Witchcraft Act 1542 was enacted in England; but was repealed in 1547. The Witchcraft Act 1563 introduced the death penalty for any sorcery used to cause someone's death.  In 1604 the Witchcraft Act was reformed to include anyone to have made a Pact with Satan.

The witch trials

In England, it was not as common as in some other nations to be accused of having attended a Witches' Sabbath or having made a Pact with Satan.  The typical victim of an English witch trial was a poor old woman with a bad reputation, who were accused by her neighbours of having a familiar and of having injured or caused harm to other people's livestock by use of sorcery.

About 500 people are estimated to have been executed for witchcraft in England.

Normally, people sentenced for witchcraft in England were executed by hanging. An exception was made when the person had committed another crime for which people were executed by burning at the stake. For example, Mary Lakeland was burned at the stake in Ipswich on 9 September 1645 after having been judged for witchcraft, but she was not burned for the crime of witchcraft, but because she had used witchcraft to murder her husband, and the murder of a husband was defined as petty treason, for which the punishment was burning. That was also the reason to why Margaret Read of King's Lynn in 1590 and Mary Oliver of Norwich in 1659 were also executed by burning after having been sentenced for witchcraft.

Political and Religious Influences
Historian John Callow argues in his 2022 book, The Last Witches of England, that witchcraft trials and convictions were influenced by political and religious tension between nonconformist Whigs, on the one hand, and the adherents of Anglican Toryism, on the other hand, after the English Civil War.

End of witchcraft prosecutions
The 1682 Bideford witch trial resulted in the last people confirmed to have been executed for witchcraft in England, but the last person to be executed was probably Mary Hicks in 1716, whose story is recorded in an eight-page pamphlet published in the same year.

Jane Wenham (died 1730) was one of the last people to be condemned to death for witchcraft in England, although her conviction was set aside. Her trial in 1712 is commonly but erroneously regarded as the last witch trial in England.

The Witchcraft Act 1735 finally concluded prosecutions for alleged witchcraft in England after sceptical jurists, especially Sir John Holt (1642-1710), had already largely ended convictions of alleged witches under English law.

Colonies 

Witch trials occurred also in the English colonies, where English law was applied. This was particularly the case in the Thirteen Colonies in North America. Examples of these were the Connecticut Witch Trials from 1647 to 1663. The most famous of these trials were the Salem witch trials in 1692. Two women were acquitted of witchcraft charges in the Province of Pennsylvania in 1683 after a trial in Philadelphia before William Penn.

See also
 Channel Islands Witch Trials
 Witch trials in Scotland
 Witch trials in the early modern period

References

Further reading

15th-century establishments in England
1735 disestablishments in England
Early Modern law
Early Modern politics
Legal history of England
Political history of England
Social history of England
16th century in England
17th century in England
18th century in England
Witch trials in England